Luigi Beccali (19 November 1907 – 29 August 1990) was the first Italian to win an Olympic gold medal in running, in the 1500 metres at the 1932 Summer Olympics, and the first Italian to win a European Championship title in athletics.

Biography
Born in Milan, Luigi Beccali, as a youth, was fascinated by cycling and track and field athletics, but choose the latter, when he met the coach Dino Nai.

Luigi Beccali, an Italian champion in 1500 m from 1928 to 1931, became a national hero overnight when he won the Olympic 1500 m gold at Los Angeles.

In 1933, Beccali ran three world records. At first he equalled Jules Ladoumègue's world record 3:49.2, then lowered it to 3:49.0. At the end of the year he also set the  world record of 2:10.0.

Beccali won the 1500 m at the first European Championships in 1934, but was outrun by Jack Lovelock at the 1936 Summer Olympics, settling for third place in 1500 m. He was again third in 1500 m at the European Championships in 1938. He also won the Italian championships from 1934 to 1938 in 1500 m and at 1935 in the 5000 m.

Beccali was originally a council surveyor, responsible for road maintenance. His work schedule allowed him to train twice a day. He eventually moved to the United States, and retired from running there in 1941, becoming a wine trader.

See also
 Walk of Fame of Italian sport
 FIDAL Hall of Fame

References

External links 
 

1907 births
1990 deaths
Athletes from Milan
Italian male middle-distance runners
Olympic athletes of Italy
Athletes (track and field) at the 1928 Summer Olympics
Athletes (track and field) at the 1932 Summer Olympics
Athletes (track and field) at the 1936 Summer Olympics
Olympic gold medalists for Italy
Olympic bronze medalists for Italy
World record setters in athletics (track and field)
European Athletics Championships medalists
Medalists at the 1936 Summer Olympics
Medalists at the 1932 Summer Olympics
Olympic gold medalists in athletics (track and field)
Olympic bronze medalists in athletics (track and field)